The Triangle Round Robin was a golf tournament on the LPGA Tour from 1953 to 1962. It was played at several different courses on the East Coast of the United States.

For its first nine years it was played using a "round robin" format, similar to the format used in the PGA Tour's Goodall Palm Beach Round Robin. The field was 16 players and they played in four foursomes over five rounds for a total of 90 holes. A player earned or lost points on each hole, in a match play style, based on her score versus her three opponents for that round. A player scored "+1" for each hole won and "−1" for each hole lost to each opponent. The groups were shuffled after every round so that every player played one round against every other player. The player with the most points after five rounds won. In 1962, the tournament shifted to a tradition 72-hole stroke play event.

The tournament sponsor was the Triangle Conduit and Cable company and its owner John E. McAuliffe.

Winners

References

1953 establishments in New Jersey
1962 disestablishments in New Jersey
Former LPGA Tour events
Golf in Massachusetts
Golf in New Jersey
Golf in New York (state)
Golf in Virginia
Events in Essex County, Massachusetts
Marblehead, Massachusetts
Sports competitions in Massachusetts
Sports competitions in New Jersey
Sports competitions in New York (state)
Sports competitions in Virginia
Sports in Essex County, Massachusetts
Sports in New Rochelle, New York
Recurring sporting events established in 1953
Recurring sporting events disestablished in 1962
Tourist attractions in Essex County, Massachusetts